Ctenucha popayana is a moth of the family Erebidae. It is found in Colombia.

References

popayana
Moths described in 1911